Vortex (also known as Blondie and Germacide) is a 1976 erotic thriller film directed by Sergio Gobbi from a screenplay he co-wrote with Catherine Arley and Lucio Attinelli, based on Arley's 1973 novel Duel au premier sang. It stars Bibi Andersson, Catherine Jourdan, Mathieu Carrière and Rod Taylor.

The film was shot in Paris in September 1975.

References

External links
 Vortex at the Complete Rod Taylor Site
 
 

1976 films
1970s English-language films
1970s erotic thriller films
Adultery in films
English-language French films
English-language German films
Films about the United Nations
Films based on French novels
Films directed by Sergio Gobbi
Films scored by Stelvio Cipriani
Films shot in Paris
French erotic thriller films
German erotic thriller films
West German films
1970s French films
1970s German films